"Loving You Is Sweeter Than Ever" is a 1966 song written by Ivy Jo Hunter and Stevie Wonder. It was performed by the Four Tops via the Motown label. In addition to co-writing the song, Wonder also instrumentally contributed drums to the track.

Cash Box described the song as a "hard-pounding, rhythmic, pop-R&B romancer all about a lucky guy who has finally found the gal that he’s always dreamed about."

Credits 
 Lead vocals by Levi Stubbs
 Background vocals by Abdul "Duke" Fakir, Renaldo "Obie" Benson & Lawrence Payton
 Instrumentation by The Funk Brothers
 Drums by Stevie Wonder

Chart performance 
The song peaked at number 12 on the Billboard Hot Rhythm & Blues Singles chart and number 45 on the Billboard Hot 100.

Cover versions 
 Nick Kamen released a version in 1987, where it went to number 16 in the UK Singles Chart. The Band covered the song on the bonus disc of their concert album Rock of Ages.
Susan Tedeschi covered it on her album Hope and Desire.

References

External links 
List of "Loving You Is Sweeter Than Ever" recordings

1966 songs
1966 singles
1987 singles
Four Tops songs
Songs written by Ivy Jo Hunter
Songs written by Stevie Wonder
Motown singles
Nick Kamen songs
Song recordings produced by Ivy Jo Hunter